John Thomas "Jack" Davies II (born January 6, 1932) is a Minnesota DFL politician, a former legislator and jurist, and a former President of the Minnesota Senate.

Davies served as a sports editor for KSTP-TV, and later earned a law degree from the University of Minnesota, eventually working as a professor at William Mitchell College of Law. Davies was first elected to the Minnesota Senate in 1959, and served until 1983. While in office, he served as chair of the judiciary committee, and as President of the Senate during his last term. In 1990, Davies was appointed to the Minnesota Court of Appeals by Gov. Rudy Perpich, a position he held until he retired in 2000.

References

Minnesota Court of Appeals judges
Presidents of the Minnesota Senate
Democratic Party Minnesota state senators
Journalists from Minnesota
1932 births
Living people
People from Wells County, North Dakota
Politicians from Minneapolis
University of Minnesota Law School alumni
Journalists from North Dakota
Lawyers from Minneapolis